Aljaž Hočevar (born 20 August 1991) is a Slovenian former cyclist, who rode professionally between 2010 and 2014 for the  team.

Major results

2011
 3rd Tour of Vojvodina II
2013
 1st Trofej Umag
 2nd Central European Tour Budapest GP
 5th Banja Luka Belgrade I
2014
 2nd Central European Tour Budapest GP
 6th Trofej Umag

References

External links

1991 births
Living people
Slovenian male cyclists